Oronzo is an Italian personal name, derived from the Latin Orontius.  

It can refer to:

Saint Oronzo (Orontius)
Oronzo Vito Gasparo, American artist 
Don Oronzo Squarciafico Pinelli Ravaschieri Fieschi, 5th Prince of Belmonte
Oronzo Pugliese, Italian football manager
Oronzo Reale, Italian politician